Raosaheb Rangnath Borade (Marathi-रावसाहेब रंगनाथ बोराडे) (born -1940) is a Marathi author. A writer known mostly for his rural themes, he first came to attention with his first novel Pachola (Fallen foliage).  Published in 1970s, Pachola was translated into English and Hindi.

Borade was born at Katgaon in Latur district of Maharashtra in 1940.  He worked as a principal at a local college at Vaijapur. He has penned 12 novels, 15 collections of short stories, and 15 plays.

References

Marathi-language writers
1940 births
People from Marathwada
Marathi novelists
Living people